Dibs may refer to:

 Pekmez, Arabic fruit molasses
 Dibs (song), One cannot call dibs on two seats for the rest of his life. One must choose. 
 The subject of Dibs in Search of Self, an emotionally crippled boy 
 Mr Dibs (born 1964), a British rock musician
 Nestlé Dibs, a frozen snack
 To call dibs, to assert a claim in children's language
 In Chicago, the practice of using a parking chair to save a shoveled-out parking space

See also
 DIB (disambiguation)